"Gasoline" is a song by Canadian singer the Weeknd. A synth-pop and new wave track, the song was written by the Weeknd, OPN, and Matt Cohn, and produced by the three alongside Max Martin and Oscar Holter. A music video for the song was released on January 11, 2022.

Background and promotion
The song's name was first revealed on January 5, 2022, when Canadian singer the Weeknd posted the track listing for the song's parent album Dawn FM (2022). A music video for the song was announced on January 10, 2022, and then released the following day on January 11, 2022.

The song was originally intended to be released to US contemporary hit radio through XO and Republic Records on January 18, 2022, as the third single from his fifth studio album Dawn FM (2022) but its release was cancelled.

Lyrics and composition
"Gasoline" has been described as a synth-pop and new wave track where the Weeknd sings about an unbalanced relationship with a woman who is his crutch and support system for drug problems.

Critical reception 
"Gasoline" was met with critical acclaim, receiving particular praise for its production, melodies and The Weeknd's vocals. Craig Jenkins from Vulture drew comparisons of the song's vocal affectations and drum programming to the United Kingdom's '80s pop rap scene.

Music video 
A music video for the song was released on January 11, 2022. It was directed by Matilda Finn with visuals by cinematographer Jon Chema and expands on the story arc presented in the previous visuals released for the album.

The clip begins with an older version of the Weeknd getting into a car accident and then ending up in a nightclub where he finds a younger version enjoying himself on the dancefloor. This younger version of himself then walks around the club and sees corrupted versions of other dancers. During this, the younger version of the Weeknd sees his older self and begins to go straight to him. The clip then concludes with the younger version of the Weeknd brutally beating his older self, presumably to death.

Charts

References

External links
 
 

2022 songs
Canadian synth-pop songs
Songs written by the Weeknd
The Weeknd songs
Song recordings produced by the Weeknd
Song recordings produced by Max Martin
Republic Records singles